Gladstone's Library, known until 2010 as St Deiniol's Library, is a residential library in Hawarden, Flintshire, Wales. It is a Grade I listed building and a registered charity.

Gladstone's Library is Britain's only Prime Ministerial Library and the national memorial to William Ewart Gladstone.

It is home to a collection of more than 250,000 printed items, including theological, historical, cultural and political materials.

Foundation
The library was founded by William Gladstone in 1894. He was eager to share his personal library with others, especially those who faced financial constraint. He would allow bright children and young adults of the village of Hawarden to use his collection. His desire, his daughter Mary Gladstone said, was to "bring together books who had no readers with readers who had no books".

In 1895, at the age of 85, William Gladstone gave £40,000 to the library and much of his own collection. Armed with only his valet and one of his daughters, William Gladstone wheeled 32,000 books three quarters of a mile between his home at Hawarden Castle and the library. He unpacked them and put them onto shelves using his own classification system.

In a diary entry dated 23 December 1895, he concisely described the library's founding thus: 
"I have this day constituted my trust at St Deiniol's. The cost of the work has been I think £41 to £42000, including some charges of maintenance to Dec. 31. 95. May God of His mercy prosper it."

Following his death in 1898, a public appeal was launched for funds to provide a permanent building to house the collection and replace the temporary structure. The £9,000 raised provided an imposing building, designed by John Douglas, which was officially opened by Earl Spencer on 14 October 1902 as the National Memorial to W.E. Gladstone. The Gladstone family were themselves to fulfill the founder's vision by funding the residential wing, which welcomed its first resident on 29 June 1906.

See also 
Dr Williams's Library in London
List of non-ecclesiastical and non-residential works by John Douglas

References

External links

Official website
U.S. Friends of Gladstone's Library

Library buildings completed in 1902
Houses completed in 1906
Libraries in Wales
John Douglas buildings
Tourist attractions in Flintshire
Grade I listed buildings in Flintshire
William Ewart Gladstone
Authors' libraries
1906 establishments in Wales
Charities based in Wales